Glebocarcinus is a genus of crabs formerly included in the genus Cancer.

Species
The genus contains two species:

References

Cancroidea